Horinji Dam is an earthfill dam located in Toyama prefecture in Japan. The dam is used for irrigation. The catchment area of the dam is 1.3 km2. The dam impounds about 1  ha of land when full and can store 50 thousand cubic meters of water. The construction of the dam was started on 1953 and completed in 1955.

References

Dams in Toyama Prefecture
1955 establishments in Japan